Fitzherbert might refer to:

Places
 Fitzherbert, ward of Palmerston North, Manawatu-Wanganui, New Zealand.

People

Surname 
 Anthony Fitzherbert (1470–1538), English judge
 Basil Fitzherbert, 14th Baron Stafford (1926–1986), English landowner and peer
 Eugene Fitzherbert, fictional character from Disney's Tangled
 Francis Fitzherbert, 15th Baron Stafford, (born 1954)
 Margaret Fitzherbert (born 1969), Australian politician
 Maria Fitzherbert, Spouse of King George IV (marriage void)
 Nicholas Fitzherbert, 1550-1612
 Alleyne FitzHerbert, 1st Baron St Helens (1753–1839)
 Thomas Fitzherbert (1552–1640)
 William Fitzherbert (disambiguation), multiple people
 William Fitzherbert (New Zealand politician) (1810–1891), New Zealand politician
 Fitzherbert baronets, Baronetcy of Tissington was created 1784

Given name 
 Christopher Fitzherbert Hackett, Barbadian
 Fitzherbert Adams (1651—1719), scholar and benefactor
 Henry FitzHerbert Wright (1870–1947), lawyer
 Fitzherbert Marriott, 19th century archdeacon of Hobart